In geometry, a birotunda is any member of a family of dihedral-symmetric polyhedra, formed from two rotunda adjoined through the largest face. They are similar to a bicupola but instead of alternating squares and triangles, it alternates pentagons and triangles around an axis. There are two forms, ortho- and gyro-: an orthobirotunda has one of the two rotundas is placed as the mirror reflection of the other, while in a gyrobirotunda one rotunda is twisted relative to the other.

The pentagonal birotundas can be formed with regular faces, one a Johnson solid, the other a semiregular polyhedron:
 pentagonal orthobirotunda,
 pentagonal gyrobirotunda, which is also called an icosidodecahedron.

Other forms can be generated with dihedral symmetry and distorted equilateral pentagons.

Examples

See also
Gyroelongated pentagonal birotunda
Elongated pentagonal orthobirotunda
Elongated pentagonal gyrobirotunda

References
Norman W. Johnson, "Convex Solids with Regular Faces", Canadian Journal of Mathematics, 18, 1966, pages 169–200. Contains the original enumeration of the 92 solids and the conjecture that there are no others.
  The first proof that there are only 92 Johnson solids.

Johnson solids